Cherokee County, Alabama is a county located in the northeastern part of the U.S. state of Alabama.  As of the 2020 census, the population was 24,971. Its county seat is Centre. The county is named for the Cherokee tribe.

History
The area included in today's Cherokee County, for centuries, had belonged to the Muscogee (Creek) Nation of Native Americans. Cherokees began moving into the area a generation before the forced Indian Removal. To this day, there are few Native Americans in Cherokee County.

On January 9, 1836, the Alabama legislature created Cherokee County with its present boundaries. Two years later, the United States government removed, by force, all Cherokees who had refused to leave on what would become known as the Trail of Tears.

Cherokee County was in the news again on Palm Sunday, March 27, 1994, when it was hit by a F4 tornado. Goshen United Methodist Church was destroyed only twelve minutes after the National Weather Service at Birmingham had issued a warning for northern Calhoun, southeastern Etowah, and southern Cherokee counties.

Geography
It is the second-smallest county in Alabama by land area.

Major highways
 U.S. Highway 278
 U.S. Highway 411
 State Route 9
 State Route 35
 State Route 68
 State Route 273
 State Route 283

Adjacent counties
DeKalb County - north
Chattooga County, Georgia - northeast
Floyd County, Georgia - east
Polk County, Georgia - southeast
Cleburne County - south
Calhoun County - south
Etowah County - west

National protected areas
 Little River Canyon National Preserve (part)
 Talladega National Forest (part)

Water Features
 The Coosa River flows through the county, much of it now part of Weiss Lake.

Demographics

2020

As of the 2020 United States census, there were 24,971 people, 10,737 households, and 7,307 families residing in the county.

2010
As of the 2010 census, there were 25,989 people, 10,626 households, and 7,493 families living in the county.  The population density was 47 people per square mile (18/km2). There were 16,267 housing units at an average density of 27 per square mile (10/km2).  The racial makeup of the county was 92.7% White, 4.6% Black or African American, 0.5% Native American, 0.2% Asian, 0.35% from other races, and 1.5% from two or more races.  1.2% of the population were Hispanic or Latino of any race.

Of the 10,626 households 25.1% had children under the age of 18 living with them, 55.3% were married couples living together, 10.4% had a female householder with no husband present, and 29.5% were non-families. 26.0% of households were one person and 10.4% were one person aged 65 or older.  The average household size was 2.42 and the average family size was 2.89.

The age distribution was 21.4% under the age of 18, 7.3% from 18 to 24, 22.8% from 25 to 44, 30.6% from 45 to 64, and 17.9% 65 or older.  The median age was 43.9 years. For every 100 females there were 98.4 males.  For every 100 females age 18 and over, there were 101.8 males.

The median household income was $40,690 and the median family income  was $47,365. Males had a median income of $40,050 versus $27,352 for females. The per capita income for the county was $21,322.  About 13.7% of families and 17.6% of the population were below the poverty line, including 27.3% of those under age 18 and 9.4% of those age 65 or over.

2000
At the 2000 census there were 23,988 people, 9,719 households, and 7,201 families living in the county.  The population density was 43 people per square mile (17/km2).  There were 14,025 housing units at an average density of 25 per square mile (10/km2).  The racial makeup of the county was 92.83% White, 5.54% Black or African American, 0.31% Native American, 0.14% Asian, 0.35% from other races, and 0.83% from two or more races.  0.85% of the population were Hispanic or Latino of any race.
Of the 9,719 households 28.90% had children under the age of 18 living with them, 61.40% were married couples living together, 9.20% had a female householder with no husband present, and 25.90% were non-families. 23.90% of households were one person and 10.40% were one person aged 65 or older.  The average household size was 2.43 and the average family size was 2.86.

The age distribution was 22.20% under the age of 18, 7.60% from 18 to 24, 27.60% from 25 to 44, 26.70% from 45 to 64, and 15.90% 65 or older.  The median age was 40 years. For every 100 females there were 96.70 males.  For every 100 females age 18 and over, there were 93.50 males.

The median household income was $30,874 and the median family income  was $36,920. Males had a median income of $29,978 versus $20,958 for females. The per capita income for the county was $15,543.  About 11.80% of families and 15.60% of the population were below the poverty line, including 20.40% of those under age 18 and 14.90% of those age 65 or over.

Education 
Cherokee County contains one public school district. There are approximately 3,800 students in public K-12 schools in Cherokee County.

The county contains one public higher education institution. Gadsden State Community College operates a campus located in Centre.

Districts 
School districts include:

 Cherokee County School District

Government
Historically Democratic, Cherokee County became competitive by the end of the 20th century and is now reliably Republican at the presidential level. The last Democrat to win the county in a presidential election is Bill Clinton, who won it by a comfortable margin in 1996.

Communities

City

 Centre (County Seat)
 Piedmont (partly in Calhoun County)

Towns

 Cedar Bluff
 Collinsville (Partly in DeKalb County)
 Gaylesville
 Leesburg
 Sand Rock (Partly in DeKalb County)

Census-designated places

 Broomtown
 Spring Garden

Unincorporated communities

 Adams Crossroads
 Antioch
 Alexis
 Billy Goat Hill
 Bluffton
 Blue Pond
 Bomar
 Congo
 Ellisville
 Elrath
 Forney
 Hopewell
 Hurley
 Key
 Little River
 McCord Crossroads
 McFrey Crossroads
 McGhee
 Moshat
 Newberry Crossroads
 Pleasant Gap
 Rock Run
 Round Mountain
 Sanford Springs
 Tecumseh Furnace

Ghost town
 Turkey Town
 Bluffton

See also
National Register of Historic Places listings in Cherokee County, Alabama
Properties on the Alabama Register of Landmarks and Heritage in Cherokee County, Alabama

References

Notes

External links
Cherokee County Chamber of Commerce
Cherokee County Historical Society
Cherokee County Historical Museum

 

Alabama placenames of Native American origin
 
1836 establishments in Alabama
Populated places established in 1836
Counties of Appalachia